Slunce, seno, jahody is a Czech comedy film made in 1983, usually regarded as one of the classics of the Czech comedy industry. Written and directed by Zdeněk Troška, it was filmed and set in Hoštice, a small rural village in the Czech portion of the former Czechoslovakia. It is a play on the perceived stereotypes of daily life in a village community.

Plot
A Czech agricultural student, Šimon Plánička, arrives at the small South Bohemian town of Hoštice, and joins the local JZD (agricultural co-op) with the intention of trying out his experiment regarding the "Milk yield of cows in regards to a cultured environment". He runs into difficulty with the directorship of the JZD, but he finds them eager to help once they hear he's the son of the local agricultural commissioner, as his last name is also Plánička. Blažena Škopková is given the task of finding out how things are looking. However everything is complicated by the jealousy of Blažena's boyfriend Venca.

Cast
 Pavel Kikinčuk as student Šimon Plánička
 Helena Růžičková as Mařena Škopková, Blažena's mother
 Stanislav Tříska as Vladimír Škopek, Blažena's father
 Arnoštka Červená as grandmother Škopková
 Veronika Kánská as Blažena Škopková
 Bronislav Černý as plumber Venca Konopník
 Marie Pilátová as Vlasta Konopníková, Venca's mother
 Václav Troška as Konopník, Venca's father
 Petra Pyšová as waitress Miluna
 Luděk Kopřiva as parish priest Otík
 Vlastimila Vlková as priest's housekeeper Cecilka
 Jiří Lábus as inseminator Béďa
 Jiřina Jirásková as Václavka Hubičková
 Pavel Vondruška as secretary Mošna
 Miroslav Zounar as Chairman of the JZD Pepa Rádl
 Jaroslava Kretschmerová as secretary of the JZD, nickname Evík
 Marie Švecová as Mařenka Kelišová, nickname Keliška
 Jiří Růžička as fat Josef

References

External links
 
  Czechoslovak Film Database page
  Shorts from the film

1984 films
Czechoslovak comedy films
1980s Czech-language films
1984 comedy films
Czech comedy films
Films directed by Zdeněk Troška